Cassandra: Warrior Angel is a Filipino horror fantasy series starring Gabby Concepcion, Eula Valdez, and Eula Caballero. It premiered on May 6, 2013, and serves as the second season of Third Eye.

Overview 
Replacing the Derek Ramsay-starrer Kidlat, the latter had a fictional crossover with Cassandra: Warrior Angel in its last two weeks.

Cast and characters

Main Cast
 Eula Caballero as Cassandra/Angela
 Josh Stageland as Calix/Alim
 Eula Valdez as Larissa/Gloria Cruz
 Gabby Concepcion as Azrael/Uriel/Ariel
 Albie Casiño as Jude Solcruz
 JC de Vera as Gabriel
 Pen Medina as Lolo Gimo
 Alwyn Uytingco as Arman/Cristoff de Luna

Supporting Cast 
 William Martinez as Ermi
 Jan Michael Legacion as leo
 Mercedes Cabral as Camilla/Hunyango
 Helga Krapf as Mara de Luna
 Jopay Paguia as Imelda
 Dianne Medina as Faye
 Mon Confiado as Dado
 Biboy Ramirez as SPO2 Jaime Santiago
 Arthur Acuña as Ezekiel de Luna
 Vangie Labalan as Aling Belay
 Noel Urbano as Abdon
 Morissette Amon as Kristel
 Rocky Salumbides as Barabas/Tikbalang
 Joaqui Tupas as Maldo
 Karel Marquez as Louella
 Epi Quizon as Henry
 Victor Silayan as Adrian/Tikbalang

Recurring cast from Third Eye 
 Lorna Tolentino as Jana Alcuaz
 Daniel Matsunaga as Lucas
 Victor Silayan as Adrian
 Clint Gabo as Dongbi
 Jenny Miller as Sonia de Vera
 Darlene Alquintos as Yuri
 Gelli de Belen as Manananggal
 Richard Quan as Manananggal 
 Lilia Cuntapay† as Aling Ursula 
 Iwa Moto as Ursula's mother

See also 
List of programs aired by The 5 Network

References

External links 

TV5 (Philippine TV network) drama series
Philippine drama television series
2013 Philippine television series debuts
2013 Philippine television series endings
Philippine horror fiction television series
Filipino-language television shows